Stefano Palmieri (born 18 September 1964) is a Sammarinese politician, who served as a Captain Regent of San Marino together with Matteo Ciacci from 1 April 2018 to 1 October 2018. He had previously served in the same position for the semester from 1 October 2009 to 1 April 2010, alongside Francesco Mussoni.

Life 
Member of the Popular Alliance (Alleanza Popolare), Palmieri is in the Grand and General Council since 2006. He was one of the founders of "Movimento Biancoazzurro" that merged into Alleanza Popolare in 2005.

Palmieri is a certified accountant, married and father of two sons.

Honours

Foreign honours 
  : Grand Cross of the Order of Saint-Charles (5 March 2010)

References

1964 births
Living people
People from Serravalle (San Marino)
Captains Regent of San Marino
Members of the Grand and General Council
Popular Alliance (San Marino) politicians
Grand Crosses of the Order of Saint-Charles